{{DISPLAYTITLE:C18H27NO2}}
The molecular formula C18H27NO2 may refer to:

 Alifedrine, a partial beta-adrenergic agonist
 Caramiphen, an anticholinergic drug
 Dyclonine, an over-the-counter local anesthetic
 S33005, a serotonin–norepinephrine reuptake inhibitor